Gideon Levi Ericsson (2 March 1871 – 27 January 1936) was a Swedish sport shooter who competed in the 1912 Summer Olympics. He won a bronze medal in the 25 m small-bore rifle event and finished 37th–39th in the 50 m pistol and 50 m rifle, prone events.

References

1871 births
1936 deaths
Swedish male sport shooters
ISSF rifle shooters
ISSF pistol shooters
Olympic shooters of Sweden
Shooters at the 1912 Summer Olympics
Olympic bronze medalists for Sweden
Olympic medalists in shooting
Sport shooters from Stockholm
Medalists at the 1912 Summer Olympics
19th-century Swedish people
20th-century Swedish people